Lone Oak may refer to:

 Lone Oak, California, former name of Lonoak, California
 Lone Oak, Georgia
 Lone Oak, Kansas
 Lone Oak, Kentucky
 Lone Oak, Tennessee
 Lone Oak, Texas, a city in Hunt County
 Lone Oak, Bexar County, Texas, a small unincorporated community

See also 
 Lone Oaks, a historic Greek Revival mansion in the Greater Deyerle neighborhood of Roanoke, Virginia
 Lone Oak High School (disambiguation)